Entelopes is a genus of longhorn beetles of the subfamily Lamiinae, containing the following species:

subgenus Aspineoentelops   
 Entelopes longzhouensis Hua, 1990

subgenus Entelopes
 Entelopes glauca Guérin-Méneville, 1844
 Entelopes nigritarsis Breuning, 1968
 Entelopes similis Pascoe, 1866
 Entelopes subsimilis Breuning, 1968

subgenus Mustafaia  (nomen novum for Shelfordia )
 Entelopes fuscotarsalis Breuning, 1954
 Entelopes shelfordi Aurivillius, 1923

subgenus Wallaceentelopes 
 Entelopes griseipennis Breuning, 1954
 Entelopes wallacei Pascoe, 1856

References

Saperdini